Ada Twist, Scientist is a 2021 animated preschool streaming television series, based on the eponymous book series by Andrea Beaty and David Roberts. Developed and executive produced by Chris Nee for Netflix, the series premiered on September 28, 2021. A second season was released on January 25, 2022.

Voice cast

Main
Amanda Christine as Ada Twist, an intellectual 9-year-old girl, and a scientist. She's smart, kindhearted, sensitive, and always sweet. Her catchphrases are "Loading the Lab!", "Wasn't that cool? Science is the best.", and "We don't quit, we got grit!". She has her own magic lab and her big book of discoveries and inventions. Her favorite animal is a ladybug.
Nicholas Crovetti as Iggy Peck, a fearful 8-year-old boy, and an architect. He's caring, extremely nervous, shy, quiet, and easygoing. His favorite animal is a whale shark.
Candace Kozak as Rosie Revere, an energetic 7-year-old girl, and an engineer. She's funny, a bit bossy, positive, and confident. She is also tomboyish which is what makes her always have her red bandanna with white polka dots all the time. Her favorite animal is a unicorn.
Supporting
Terrence Little Gardenhigh as Arthur Twist, Ada's 11-year-old brother who loves magic and sports. He's a bit bored and cool. He has a pet, named Lil Liz.
Susan Kelechi Watson as Mom Twist
Taye Diggs as Dad Twist
Frank Welker as Mooshu

Episodes

Season 1 (2021)

Season 2 (2022)

Season 3 (2022)

Season 4 (2023)

Production
The series was first announced in October 2020.

Release
Ada Twist, Scientist was released on Netflix on September 28, 2021.

Reception
Common Sense Media review.
New Scientist review.
Decider review.
Plugged In review.

Accolades 
The series received a 2022 Annie Award for Best Animated Television/Broadcast Production for Preschool Children.

The series also received a 2022 Children's and Family Emmy Awards award for Outstanding Preschool Animated Series

References

External links

2021 American television series debuts
2020s American animated television series
2020s American black cartoons
2020s American children's comedy television series
2020s preschool education television series
American children's animated adventure television series
American children's animated comedy television series
American children's animated fantasy television series
American children's animated musical television series
American computer-animated television series
American preschool education television series
Animated preschool education television series
Animated television series about children
Annie Award winners
English-language Netflix original programming
Television series by Brown Bag Films
Television series by Netflix Animation
Television series by Higher Ground Productions
Netflix children's programming
Children's and Family Emmy Award winners